"The Otto Show" is the twenty-second episode of the third season of the American animated television series The Simpsons. It first aired on the Fox network in the United States on April 23, 1992. In the episode, Bart wants to become a rock star after attending a Spinal Tap concert, so Homer and Marge buy him a guitar. He shows the guitar to Otto, who plays it and makes the children late for school. While racing to Springfield Elementary, Otto crashes the school bus and is suspended until he earns a driver's license. Unable to pay his rent, Otto moves in with the Simpsons.

The episode was written by Jeff Martin and directed by Wes Archer. It was the first episode of the show to feature Otto Mann in a prominent role. "The Otto Show" features an appearance from Spinal Tap, a parody band that first appeared in the 1984 mockumentary film This Is Spinal Tap. The episode guest stars Michael McKean as David St. Hubbins and Christopher Guest as Nigel Tufnel. Harry Shearer, who is a regular Simpsons cast member, reprises his This Is Spinal Tap role as Derek Smalls.

In its original airing on the Fox Network, the episode had an 11.5 Nielsen rating and finished the week ranked 41st. The episode received positive reviews and Spinal Tap was ranked as the 18th best guest appearance on the show by IGN.

Plot
Bart and Milhouse attend a Spinal Tap concert, but the poor condition of the arena leads Spinal Tap to angrily end their concert after only 20 minutes. A riot breaks out afterwards.

Bart decides he wants to become a rock guitarist, so Homer and Marge buy him an electric guitar, but he struggles to learn how to play it. On the school bus, Bart tells the driver, Otto, that his guitar must be broken, but Otto plays it in an impromptu performance that wows the bus passengers. After his rendition of "Free Bird" makes the children late for school, Otto's reckless driving runs Spinal Tap's tour bus off the road and crashes the school bus. Otto admits to Officer Lou he does not have a driver's license and is suspended without pay. Unable to pay his rent, he is evicted from his apartment. Homer and Marge reluctantly let him stay in their garage after Bart pleads with them, but Otto soon makes a nuisance of himself and Homer demands that he leave.

Telling his instructor Patty that he wants to pass the test so he can "staple my license to Homer Simpson's big bald head", Patty gives Otto the correct answers to the written test. She gives him a passing grade after being amused by Otto's story of Homer's crude behavior. Otto regains his job.

Production

"The Otto Show" was written by Jeff Martin and directed by Wes Archer. The episode's title is a pun on auto show. The episode was the first to feature bus driver Otto Mann in a prominent role. Otto's full name is revealed for the first time. Writers Jay Kogen and Wallace Wolodarsky had originally wanted to name him Otto Mechanic, but the animators gave him the last name Mann.

"The Otto Show" features an appearance from the characters of Spinal Tap, a parody band that first appeared in the 1984 mockumentary film This Is Spinal Tap. The episode guest stars Michael McKean as David St. Hubbins and Christopher Guest as Nigel Tufnel. Harry Shearer, who is a regular Simpsons cast member, also starred in This Is Spinal Tap and reprises his role as Derek Smalls, the third member of the group. The episode follows the approach of the film by presenting the band as if they were a real group. According to executive producer Al Jean, the executives at Fox were unhappy about having the band guest star, partially because it cost a lot of money to purchase rights to play their songs. Mike Reiss said that Fox felt that the show could have gotten a "real group" for that amount of money. The animators gave many of the members of the crowd at the Spinal Tap concert long bangs, so they would not have to animate many pairs of eyes. In the final scene to feature the band, their tour bus bursts into flames after being knocked off the road. According to the writers, the scene was not in the original script and was added because they felt the band's final scene was not interesting enough. In a 2016 interview Shearer said this was the only time Spinal Tap had worked to a script, all other movie, television and live appearances being improvised.

Cultural references
When Homer puts on an old jacket he finds a can of Billy Beer in one of the pockets. While waiting in the car during the Spinal Tap concert (as well as the ensuing riot), Homer sings along to the song "Spanish Flea" by Herb Alpert and the Tijuana Brass. The writers had a difficult time getting the rights to the song, but a writer who is related to a member of the band was able to get the rights at the last minute. Homer also hums along to "Summer Samba" during a prior segment in the car. Homer makes a comment on their situation with Otto, saying "This is not Happy Days and he is not The Fonz!" Otto then walks in and says to Homer, "Heeeeeyy, Mr. S," in reference to the long-running situation comedy. The song Otto plays on the school bus is "Free Bird" by Lynyrd Skynyrd. Otto's statement that he would prefer to be sleeping in a Dumpster brand trash container over a "Trash Co. Waste Disposal Unit" alludes to the word's status as a registered trademark for a brand of large trash containers.

Reception
In its original airing on the Fox Network, the episode had an 11.5 Nielsen rating and was viewed in approximately 10.59 million homes. It finished the week of April 20–26, 1992 ranked 41st, down from the season's average rank of 35th. The Simpsons was the fourth highest rated show on Fox that week after Married... with Children, Beverly Hills, 90210 and In Living Color.

The episode, like the whole of the third season, received mostly positive reviews from critics. The authors of the book I Can't Believe It's a Bigger and Better Updated Unofficial Simpsons Guide, Warren Martyn and Adrian Wood, wrote, "A nice episode for Otto and some great moments for Skinner as he tries to drive the bus, but especially memorable for Homer's moment of forgetfulness after the concert. Michael McKean, Christopher Guest and Harry Shearer reprise their roles from This Is Spinal Tap perfectly." MovieFreak.com's Dennis Landmann named "The Otto Show" as one of the stand-out episodes from the third season.

Nate Meyers of Digitally Obsessed was also positive about the episode, giving it a rating of five donuts out of five and writing "The writing is at full throttle here, cramming tons of jokes into the episode's 20-minute runtime with stunning success." DVD Movie Guide's Colin Jacobson wrote that it was "another solid episode. Actually, it regresses somewhat from the high quality of its predecessors. The Spinal Tap material feels somewhat tacky – it was a tie-in with their then-current attempt to sell a new album – and Otto's not a strong character. I don’t think the series ever made him the lead again, and he works best in small doses. "Otto: remains very good, but it doesn’t compete with the year’s best shows.""

The guest appearance of Spinal Tap was especially noticed. Bryce Wilson, in his review of the third season for Cinema Blend, wrote "Simpson’s [sic] voice actor Harry Shearer...reunites Spinal Tap just for "The Otto Show", an episode full of the trademark Tap banter and stage disasters that rival even the mighty 18 inch Stonehenge." IGN named Spinal Tap as the '18th best guest stars' in the show's history for this episode. Andrew Martin of Prefix Mag named Spinal Tap his favorite musical guests on The Simpsons out of a list of ten.

References

External links

 
"The Otto Show" at the Internet Movie Database

The Simpsons (season 3) episodes
1992 American television episodes
Spinal Tap (band)
Television episodes about termination of employment